"In One Ear" is a song by American rock band Cage the Elephant. It was released as the second, then re-released as the fifth single from the band's 2008 self-titled debut album. In the re-issue dated August 7, 2010, the single peaked at number one on the Billboard Alternative Songs chart, the band's second number one single on that chart. There was an American version and UK version of the music video.

Release and reception 
"In One Ear" was originally released in March 2008 as the second single from the band's self-titled debut album.
The single's B-side included an acoustic performance of their song, "Ain't No Rest for the Wicked", recorded for Radio 1's Live Lounge.

The song peaked at number one on Billboard's Alternative Songs chart in August 2010.
It also reached number 3 on the Rock Songs chart, and number 56 on the Canadian Hot 100.

Music video
There are three music videos for this song. The first two versions were released in 2008 one as the US version and the other as the UK version. The third music video premiered on April 1, 2010, on Vevo. It was directed by Isaac Rentz and shot on location in Bowling Green, Kentucky.

Chart performance

Weekly charts

Year-end charts

Certifications

See also
List of number-one Billboard Alternative Songs of 2010

References

External links
 

2008 songs
2008 singles
2010 singles
Cage the Elephant songs
Song recordings produced by Jay Joyce
Relentless Records singles
Jive Records singles
Songs written by Matt Shultz (singer)